Borbo impar, the yellow swift, is a butterfly of the family Hesperiidae. It is found from the Northern Territory of Australia and Indonesia to the Solomons

The wingspan is 30–40 mm.

The larvae feed on Poaceae species, including Panicum maximum, Pennisetum pedicellatum and Rottboellia cochinensis.

Subspecies
Borbo impar impar
Borbo impar lavinia (Waterhouse, 1932)

External links
Australian Insects

Hesperiinae
Butterflies described in 1883
Butterflies of Australia
Butterflies of Asia
Taxa named by Paul Mabille